Serhiy Prykhodko (born 21 January 1994 in Okhtyrka, Sumy Oblast, Ukraine) is a professional Ukrainian football midfielder.

Career
He is product of FC Illichivets Mariupol sportive school.

He made his début for FC Illichivets Mariupol in the Ukrainian Premier League on 20 September 2014.

References

External links

1994 births
Living people
People from Okhtyrka
Ukrainian footballers
FC Mariupol players
FC Illichivets-2 Mariupol players
Ukrainian Premier League players
Ukrainian First League players
Ukrainian Second League players
Ukrainian Amateur Football Championship players
Association football midfielders
PFC Sumy players
FC Poltava players
FC Trostianets players
FC Sumy players
FC Alians Lypova Dolyna players
Sportspeople from Sumy Oblast